The 2012 Bulgarian Cup Final was the 72nd final of the Bulgarian Cup, and was contested between Lokomotiv Plovdiv and Ludogorets Razgrad on 16 May 2012. 

Ludogorets won the final 2–1, claiming their first Bulgarian Cup title. After Dakson opened the scoring after 18 minutes, Marcelinho equalised in the 72nd minute and scored second and winner, seven minutes later.

Route to the final

Lokomotiv Plovdiv

As an A PFG team, Lokomotiv Plovdiv entered the competition in the second round. Their opening match was a 2–0 away win against Chavdar Etropole. Mihail Venkov struck early in the first half, before Sergihno hit second in the 76th minute. Lokomotiv then travelled to face Dobrudzha Dobruch at Druzhba Stadium in the third round. Dragi Kotsev scored a hattrick and Jérémie Rodrigues netted one for a 4–0 win. 

Lokomotiv were drawn to play at home against Levski Sofia in the fourth round, with Levski dominating the first half through a Toni Calvo goal. Mihail Venkov scored a header in stoppage time for a 1–1. Venkov's goal meant the match was now drawn at 1–1 and with no further goals the match went into extra-time. Zdravko Lazarov scored second goal in the 92nd minute to give Lokomotiv a 2–1 victory and ensure their place in the semi-finals. Litex Lovech were the opponents in the semi-final. Youness Bengelloun headed in the 79th minute to give Lokomotiv a 1–0 victory and secure their place in the final for the first time since 1982.

Ludogorets

Ludogorets – also an A PFG team – entered the competition in the second round too, where they were drawn at away to Beroe Stara Zagora. After a goalless 90 minutes, Miroslav Ivanov scored a winning goal in the extra-time. In the third round, their opponents were Svetkavitsa, whom Ludogorets beat 5–1 at Ludogorets Arena, courtesy of goals from Stanislav Genchev, Marcelinho, Emil Gargorov, Christian Kabasele and Ivan Stoyanov.

Ludogorets's fourth round match was against Botev Plovdiv at the Hristo Botev Stadium in Plovdiv. Ludogorets took the lead after less than 22 minutes through Marcelinho, and further goals from Mihail Aleksandrov and Kabasele resulted in a comfortable 3–0 win. In the semi-final, Ludogorets beat Septemvri Simitli comfortably, winning 4–1. Ludogorets took a two-goal lead in less than an hour after goals from Stoyanov and Kabasele. Own goal by Tero Mäntylä in the 59th minute made the score 2–1, but Stoyanov and Aleksandrov scored in the last 15 minutes to complete the win. The margin of victory was the biggest in a Bulgarian Cup round of 16 since 2011, and secured Ludogorets's first Bulgarian Cup Final.

Pre-match
Lokomotiv Plovdiv were appearing in the final for the fourth time and in all times had been beaten (in 1948, 1960, 1971 and 1982). Ludogorets were making their first appearance in the final. Their previous best was participation in the Round of 16, which had occurred one time.

Shumen-based referee Stanislav Todorov was named as the referee for the 2012 Bulgarian Cup Final on 16 May 2012. His assistants for the final were Nikolay Petrov and Georgi Slavov, with Ivaylo Stoyanov as the fourth official.

Match

Details

See also
2011–12 A Group

References 

Bulgarian Cup finals
Cup Final
PFC Lokomotiv Plovdiv matches
PFC Ludogorets Razgrad matches